Gardening in Spain reflects the different styles of Spanish art, including influences from Roman, Islamic, Italian, French, and English gardens. Modern Spanish gardening emphasize gardens and their surroundings, focusing heavily on both urban horticulture and landscape architecture.

Spanish gardens are affected by the climate and orography of Spain. The ground in Spain is generally drier than in its neighboring countries of Portugal and France. High levels of summer solar radiation in Spain have led to the creation of smaller, indoor gardens.

There are many historical parks and gardens in Spain. The first Spanish botanical garden was created near Valencia in 1633. Many new gardens with Islamic influences were created during the Renaissance. Up until the 19th century, the majority of gardens were promoted by the royalty and the aristocracy. After that, social changes facilitated the creation of parks and public gardens for the use and enjoyment of all citizens. Urban gardening evolved during the 20th century, as well as ecological awareness, which has led to the creation of new parks around Spain.

Influences

Roman period 

Gardening in Spain began during the Roman period. Ancient Rome was very advanced in regards to its architecture and engineering, and their aqueducts helped irrigate gardens in remote areas. Because of this, they were able to create swimming pools and lakes, which emphasized the beauty of the gardens. The Romans also used topiary in their gardens.

Roman gardens were linked to the domus, the home of the Roman upper class. The entrances of these homes were typically decorated with sculptures and led to gardens containing Mediterranean vegetation. This model also arose the villa, a rustic farm that generally served to accommodate middle-class civilians. There were also urban gardens were organized around an atrium and served as a communal area for all the social classes. The center of atriums had a lake decorated with mosaics, vases, or statues, and walls decorated with frescos.

Roman gardens usually had structural and architectural elements such as porticos, arches, columns, exedras, swimming pools, wooden kiosks, pergolas, arbours, and even artificial grottos (nymphaea). Water ran in abundance through channels and pilones, sometimes with small jets.

Aside from Roman domūs and villas, there were several other urban areas with greenery, such as gymnasiums and theatres. An example is the porticus post scaenam of the Theatre of Mérida, which had a garden, sculptures, and a sundial.

Islamic period 

Islamic culture in Spain greatly influenced Spanish gardening. After conquering the peninsula, the Umayyad Caliphate established many gardens, especially in its capital city of Córdoba. Islamic gardens had a lot of shade, as such gardens were usually located in arid regions. They usually had a fountain in the middle, surrounded by a walkway and greenery.

Renaissance period 
During the Renaissance, topiary grew in popularity, and gardens were filled with sculptures from Italy and Flanders. The Duke of Alba's estate had a large private Flemish garden with topiary, waterworks, and grottoes. Myrtles and lemon and orange trees were also often used in Renaissance gardens.

Philip II also greatly influenced Spanish gardening. He created many new gardens, and imported several foreign plants such as the English Elm tree.

Common plants

Trees 
 Cypress
 Lemon
 Orange

Plants 
 Balsam
 Sweet basil
 Carnation
 Honeysuckle
 Ivy
 Jasmine
 Spruge Laurel
 Marvel of Peru
 Passion Flower
 Ranunculus
 Rose Bushes

Rare trees 
 Magnolia grandiflora

See also 
 Spanish garden

References

Bibliography 
 
 
 
 
 
 
 
 
 
 
 
 
 
 
 
 
 
 
 
 
 
 
 
 
 

Gardens in Spain
Spain